The Roslyn Flats is a historic building located on the hill above downtown Davenport, Iowa, United States. It was constructed in 1901 and listed on the National Register of Historic Places in 1983. The apartment building was one of several that were built near the campus of Palmer College of Chiropractic.

Architecture
Roslyn Flats follows the basic design of apartment buildings built in the late 19th and early 20th centuries in Davenport. The building is a three-story structure built over a raised basement and constructed in brick. Bay windows frame the façade on the north and south sides and a two-story porch was constructed between them. Flanking the window bays are rusticated brick pilasters that end in Ionic caps. The cornice features a plain molded architrave below a wide frieze into which are set small Adamesque oval windows. The building features the "formalism, sharp lines and studied elegance" that is found in Federalist architecture.

References

Residential buildings completed in 1901
Apartment buildings in Davenport, Iowa
Apartment buildings on the National Register of Historic Places in Iowa
National Register of Historic Places in Davenport, Iowa